James Blundell (born 8 December 1964) is an Australian country music singer. Born in Stanthorpe, Queensland, Blundell first rose to prominence after being named "best new talent" at the 1987 Country Music Awards of Australia. Blundell has since released several albums in both Australia and the United States, with his most successful album This Road (released in 1992) selling more than 145,000 copies in Australia. Blundell was an unsuccessful candidate for the Senate in Queensland at the 2013 federal election, running for Katter's Australian Party. At the 2019 Country Music Awards of Australia, Blundell was inducted into the Hall of Fame.

Early life
Blundell was born in Queensland town of Stanthorpe, and was brought up on a sheep and cattle station near the town. As an adult he worked as a station hand across various locations in northern Australia. After a back injury sustained while working on a farm in Papua New Guinea he turned to music.

Music career

1987–1991: Career Beginnings

In 1987, Blundell won the Australia's Starker Quest at the Country Music Awards of Australia (CMAA) and won a recording contract with RCA Victor Australia where he released "Gidgee Bug Pub Song". In 1988, Blundell won the Golden Guitar Award for the "Best New Talent". Blundell signed with EMI released his eponymous debut studio album in 1989. The album spawned the singles "Cloncurry Cattle Song" and "Kimberley Moon"; both of which won him Male Vocalist of the Year awards at the CMAA in 1989 and 1990. In 1990, Blundell contributed "Until the Next Big Dry" for the 1990 compilation album Breaking Ground - New Directions in Country Music. Late in 1990, Blundell released his second studio album Hand It Down which peaked at number 50 on the ARIA charts in 1991 and won him his first ARIA Award in 1991 for Best Country Album. The single "Age of Grace" won Blundell his third consecutive Male Vocalist of the Year awards at the CMAA in 1991.

1992–2002: Commercial Success with EMI

In March 1992, Blundell released a cover of The Dingoes' song "Way Out West" with James Reyne. The song was a commercial success peaking at number 2 on the ARIA Charts and was certified gold. It won Blundell his first APRA Award for Country Song of the Year. In April, Blundell released his third studio album This Road which peaked at number 4 on the ARIA Charts, was certified platinum and has sold more than 145,000 copies in Australia. Additional singles "This Road" and "Down on the Farm" were released in 1992 and Blundell won two more Golden Guitar awards at the 1993 CMAA, including Top Selling album of the Year. In August 1993, Blundell released Touch of Water which peaked at number 11 on the ARIA Charts. Blundell continued to play regularly at folk and country music festivals around Australia. In April 1995, Blundell released his fifth studio album Earth & Sea which peaked at number 31. In 1996, disillusioned with the music industry, around Europe in a van, earning money by busking.
In 1997, Blundell featured in a Qantas commercial, singing "I Still Call Australia Home", and in the lead-up to the 1999 Australian republic referendum, Blundell recorded the official song for the "No" campaign, despite being in favour of a republic. 
In 1999, Blundell released his sixth studio album Amsterdam Breakfast which sold 8,000 copies. In August 2001, EMI released his first greatest hits album, I Shall Be Released: The Best of James Blundell, which concluded his record deal.

2003–2012: Independent Artist, CMAA Hands of Fame and CMC Hall of Fame
As an independent artist, Blundell garnered media attention for his 2003 song "Postcards from Saigon", speaking out against the war in Iraq. In 2005, the song won Australian Independent Country Music Single of the Year and Independent Country Music Male Vocalist of the Year. In 2005, Blundell released Deluge, followed by Ring Around the Moon in 2007 and Portrait of a Man in 2008.

In 2007, Blundell was inducted into the Australia Country Music Hands of Fame. In October 2010 Blundell was the narrator for Network Ten's television show, Keeping up with the Joneses and for four months from November 2010, Blundell performed in a musical theatre show, The Ultimate Rock 'n' Roll Jam Session, with Nick Barker, Dave Larkin, Ezra Lee and Doug Parkinson. Blundell released his tenth studio album Woolshed Creek in April 2011. In March 2012, Blundell was the inaugural inductee into the Country Music Channel's Hall of Fame.

2013–present: politics and music

In June 2013, Blundell became a candidate in the 2013 Australian federal election. In August 2015, Blundell released Come On In and in February 2017, his twelfth studio album Campfire which became his first charting album in over 20 years, peaking at number 58. In February 2018, a tribute album 30 Years of Pride: A Tribute to James Blundell was released.

Politics
In June 2013, Blundell was selected as Katter's Australian Party's lead Senate candidate for Queensland in the 2013 federal election. This was largely at the urging of Bob Katter, the party's founder and only federal member of parliament. Blundell had previously been approached to stand in elections by the Liberal National Party (LNP), but declined. His selection was controversial within the party, in part because he had not been a party member before his candidacy was announced, and contributed to a former vice-president, Kevin Brown, resigning his membership. Some of Blundell's political positions have been controversial within the party, notably his support for same-sex marriage and the abolition of penalty rates.

Personal life
Blundell has been married twice—first to Louise, a former manager, and second to Lidia, with whom he had two sons. He left his second wife in August 2007 for Jesse Curran, a singer who he had met at one of his concerts and while she was a contestant on Australian Idol. He and Curran have since had two children together, Fian Blundell and Ria Blundell.

Blundell was engaged to Kristal Padget in 2017. In March 2020 he announced his engagement to Rebecca Williams, 28 years after she inspired his 1992 hit "Down On The Farm".

In May 2010, Blundell filed for bankruptcy, having gone into debt attempting to finance his albums, as well as having lost money on the sale of an investment property the previous year. The bankruptcy was discharged in April 2013—had it not been, he would have ineligible to stand as a candidate for election.

Blundell's brother, Peter Blundell, died on 24 December 2021.</ref> He was a former mayor of the Stanthorpe Shire and the Southern Downs Region as well as the LNP candidate for Keppel in the 2017 Queensland state election.

Discography

James Blundell, 1989 
Hand It Down, 1990 
This Road, 1992 
Touch of Water, 1993 
Earth & Sea, 1995 
Amsterdam Breakfast, 1999
I Shall Be Released: The Best of James Blundell, 2001
Deluge, 2005
Ring Around the Moon, 2007
Essential, 2007
Portrait of a Man, 2008
Woolshed Creek, 2011
Come On In, 2015
Campfire, 2017

Awards

AIR Awards
The Australian Independent Record Awards (commonly known informally as AIR Awards) is an annual awards night to recognise, promote and celebrate the success of Australia's Independent Music sector.

|-
| AIR Awards of 2009
|Portrait of a Man 
| Best Independent Country Album
| 
|-

ARIA Music Awards
The ARIA Music Awards are a set of annual ceremonies presented by Australian Recording Industry Association (ARIA), which recognise excellence, innovation, and achievement across all genres of the music of Australia. They commenced in 1987. Blundell had been nominated for five ARIA Music Awards and has won one.

|-
| 1991 || Hand it Down || Best Country Album ||  
|-
| 1992 || "Time On His Hands" || Best Country Album ||  
|-
| 1993 || This Road ||Best Country Album ||  
|-
| 1994 || Touch of Water ||Best Adult Contemporary Album || 
|-
| 2007 || Ring Around the Moon || Best Country Album ||  
|-

APRA Awards
The APRA Awards are held in Australia and New Zealand by the Australasian Performing Right Association to recognise songwriting skills, sales and airplay performance by its members annually. Blundell has  been nominated for three awards and has won one.

|-
| 1992
| "Way Out West"  (with James Reyne) 
| Country Song of the Year
| 
|-
| 1999
| "Goondiwindi Moon"  (with Lee Kernaghan and Garth Porter) 
| Most Performed Country Work
| 
|-
| 2008
| "Higher Than Heavan"
| Country Work of the Year
| 
|-

Country Music Awards (CMAA)
Blundell has won ten Golden guitar awards at the Tamworth Country Music Awards of Australia. 
In 2019, Blundell was inducted into the Australian Roll of Renown, which honours Australian and New Zealander musicians who have shaped the music industry by making a significant and lasting contribution to Country Music.

 (wins only)
|-
| 1987 || himself || Star Maker  || 
|-
| 1988 || "Song for Louise" || New Talent of the Year  || 
|-
| 1989 || "Cloncurry Cattle Song" || Male Vocalist of the Year  || 
|-
| 1990 || "Kimberley Moon" || APRA Song of the Year  || 
|-
| 1990 || "Kimberley Moon" || Male Vocalist of the Year  || 
|-
| 1991 || "Blue Heeler" || APRA Song of the Year  || 
|-
| 1991 || "Age of Grace" || Male Vocalist of the Year  || 
|-
| 1993 || This Road || Top Selling album of the Year  || 
|-
| 1993 || "Way Out West"  (with James Reyne)  || Vocal Group or Duo of the Year  || 
|-
| 1994 || Touch of Water || Top Selling album of the Year  || 
|-
| 2007 || himself || Hands of Fame Inductee  || 
|-
| 2019 || himself || Australian Roll of Renown || 
|-

Mo Awards
The Australian Entertainment Mo Awards (commonly known informally as the Mo Awards), were annual Australian entertainment industry awards. They recognise achievements in live entertainment in Australia from 1975 to 2016. James Blundell won one award in that time.
 (wins only)
|-
| 1989
| James Blundell
| Male Country Entertainer of the Year
| 
|-

Queensland Music Awards
The Queensland Music Awards (previously known as Q Song Awards) are annual awards celebrating Queensland, Australia's brightest emerging artists and established legends. They commenced in 2006.

 (wins only)
|-
| 2011
| "Move Into the City"
| Country Song of the Year
| 
|-
|}

Tamworth Songwriters Awards
The Tamworth Songwriters Association (TSA) is an annual songwriting contest for original country songs, awarded in January at the Tamworth Country Music Festival. They commenced in 1986.
 (wins only)
|-
| 1988
| "Gidgee Pub Song" by James Blundell 
| Comedy/Novelty Song of the Year
| 
|-

References

1964 births
ARIA Award winners
Australian country singer-songwriters
Australian country singers
Australian republicans
Katter's Australian Party politicians
Living people
People from the Darling Downs
People educated at the Southport School